Gadgarra is a rural locality in the Tablelands Region, Queensland, Australia. In the  Gadgarra had a population of 3 people.

History 
Gadgarra State School opened on 28 March 1928 and closed in 1958.

In the  Gadgarra had a population of 3 people.

References 

Tablelands Region
Localities in Queensland